WZU may refer to:

 Wenzao Ursuline University of Languages, a university in Kaohsiung, Taiwan
 Wenzhou University, a university in Wenzhou, Zhejiang